John Lawton may refer to:

 John Lawton (1656–1736), thrice Member of Parliament for Newcastle-under-Lyme 
 John Lawton (died 1740) (c. 1700 – 1740), Member of Parliament for Newcastle-under-Lyme
 John Lawton (priest) (1913–1995), English cleric; Archdeacon of Warrington
 John Lawton (footballer) (1936–2017), English footballer
 John Lawton (singer) (1946–2021), British rock and blues vocalist
 John Lawton (biologist) (born 1943), British ecologist
 John Lawton (author) (born 1949), television producer and director, and author